Kenny Dixon Jr., better known by his stage name Moodymann, is an American musician based in Detroit, Michigan. He is the owner of the record labels Mahogani Music and KDJ Records. He is a member of 3 Chairs.

Career
In 1997, Moodymann released his debut album, Silentintroduction, on Planet E Communications. It compiled the previously released tracks from his own KDJ Records. He released Mahogany Brown in 1998, Forevernevermore in 2000, and Silence in the Secret Garden in 2003.

In 2012, he released Picture This as a free download. It was followed by ABCD in 2013. His self-titled album, Moodymann, was released in 2014. He released Sinner in 2019, and Taken Away in 2020. In December 2020, Moodymann portrayed a fictionalised  version of himself in the video game Grand Theft Auto Online as part of an update; he serves as one of the resident DJs at the newly-opened nightclub called the Music Locker. He subsequently appeared in a July 2021 update, under the alias "KDJ". Together with his fictional girlfriend Sessanta, he becomes a member of the underground LS Car Meet, and provides the player with several contracts.

Style and influences
Moodymann is considered to have "developed hybrid modes of recording and performance incorporating analog and digital media—the playing of 'real' instruments with 'pushing buttons live'." Philip Sherburne of Pitchfork wrote: "His sample-heavy productions have drawn on artists like Stevie Wonder, Marvin Gaye, and Chic, not to mention gospel music, and his beats have always remained rooted in disco's bump and swirl."

Personal life
In January 2019, Moodymann released a video on Instagram, which he later removed, showing the Highland Park police holding him at gunpoint in his parked car, on his property. The Highland Park police department released a statement saying that during the incident, Moodymann did not show proof of ownership of the property or an ID, which led to the arrest. Moodymann was later released after an investigation showing that he was indeed the owner of the property.

Discography

Studio albums
 Silentintroduction (1997)
 Mahogany Brown (1998)
 Forevernevermore (2000)
 Silence in the Secret Garden (2003)
 Black Mahogani (2004)
 Black Mahogani II (2004)
 Det.riot '67 (2008)
 Anotha Black Sunday (2009)
 Picture This (2012)
 ABCD (2013)
 Moodymann (2014)
 Sinner (2019)
 Taken Away (2020)

DJ mixes
 Moodymann Collection (2006)
 DJ-Kicks (2016)

EPs
 The Telephone (2001)
 I Guess U Never Been Lonely (2012)

Singles
 "I Like It" / "Emotional Content" (1994)
 "Moodymann" (1995)
 "Long Hot Sex Nights" / "The Dancer" (1995)
 "The Day We Lost the Soul" (1995)
 "Don't Be Misled!" (1996)
 "I Can't Kick This Feelin When It Hits" / "Music People" (1997)
 "U Can Dance If U Want 2" (1997)
 "In Loving Memory" (1997)
 "Dem Young Sconies" / "Bosconi" (1997)
 "Silent Introduction" (1997)
 "Music Is..." (1997)
 "Joy Pt. II" (1997)
 "Amerika" (1997)
 "Forevernevermore" (1998)
 "Just Anotha Black Sunday Morning with Grandma" (1998)
 "Sunday Morning" / "Track Four" (1998)
 "Black Mahogany" (1998)
 "Shades of Jae" (1999)
 "The Thief That Stole My Sad Days... Ya Blessin' Me" (1999)
 "Don't You Want My Love" (2000)
 "Deleted Rehearsals" (2000)
 "Analog: Live" (2000)
 "J.A.N." (2001)
 "Nmywagon" (2001)
 "Sweet Yesterday" (2003)
 "Shattered Dreams" (2003)
 "Silence in the Secret Garden" (2003)
 "Untitled" (2004)
 "Ampapella" (2005)
 "How Sweed It Is" (2005)
 "I'd Rather Be Lonely" (2007)
 "Technologystolemyvinyle" (2007)
 "Ol' Dirty Vinyl" (2010)
 "Freeki Mutha F*cker (All I Need Is U)" (2011)
 "Why Do U Feel" (2012)
 "Sloppy Cosmic" / "Hangover" (2014)
 "Neu Geu Jeup" (2017)
 "Pitch Black City Reunion" / "Got Me Coming Back Rite Now" (2018)
 "Korean Caster Meltdown" (2019)
 "Viper Is Above" (2021)

Productions
 Norma Jean Bell – "Yes I Am (I'm Gonna Get You)", "Nobody", and "Mystery" from Come into My Room (2001)
 José James – "Desire (Moodymann Remix)" from Desire & Love (2008)
 Andres – II (2009)
 Rick Wilhite – "Drum Patterns & Memories (Moodymann Mix)" from The Godson & Soul Edge (2010)
 José James – "Detroit Loveletter" from Blackmagic (2010)
 Junior Boys – "Banana Ripple (Moodymann Remix)" from Even Truer (2013)

References

External links
 
 

Year of birth missing (living people)
Living people
American DJs
American techno musicians
People from Los Angeles
American house musicians
Deep house musicians
Musicians from Detroit
Club DJs
Electronic dance music DJs
Peacefrog Records artists